Waltraut "Travka" Fritzevna Schälike (January 20, 1927 – May 14, 2021) was a Soviet-Russian scientist of German origin, historian and philosopher, author and publicist. She was a scholar of Marxism,
PhD, Docent.

Schälike was born in Berlin. Her father was Fritz Schälike. She graduated from MSU Faculty of History. She studied with Svetlana Alliluyeva.

From 1949 to 1988, she worked at the Kyrgyz National University.

From 1959, she worked at the Osh State University.

She published in Kommunist, Voprosy Istorii, Izvestia. She is the author of books (in Russian) including «Исходные основания материалистического понимания истории» («Илим», 1991). She died in Moscow, aged 94.

Works
 Schälike W. The Basic Foundations of the Materialistic Understanding of History: (Based on the works of K. Marx and F. Engels 1844-1846) (In Russian) Илим, 1991  
Schälike W. Misunderstood Marx and Some Problems of Modernity (Part 3). Russian Journal of Philosophical Sciences. 2013;(5):120-130. (In Russ.)
 Shaelike W. In Search of the Beginning of Marx Materialistic Theory of History. Article II. Russian Journal of Philosophical Sciences. 2018;(2):20-43. (In Russ.) In Search of the Beginning of Marx Materialistic Theory of History. Article II

References

External links
 Startseite | Вальтраут Шелике
 Шелике

1927 births
2021 deaths
German Marxists
German emigrants to the Soviet Union
Russian women scientists
Women historians
Scholars of Marxism
Moscow State University alumni
Academic staff of Kyrgyz National University
Academic staff of Osh State University
People from Berlin
Soviet Marxist historians